Standing on the Corner is an American avant-garde music collective led by Gio Escobar. Emerging from the New York underground art and music scene, they have been referred to as a post-genre band and praised for their use and blends of different sounds.

History

In 2014, Gio Escobar formed a guitar-based live group called Children of the Corner; the name was an homage to Harlem rap collective Children of the Corn. This project later evolved into Standing on the Corner. Escobar wrote several tape machine-recorded songs that were not initially intended for release. Later Escobar brought some of those same demos he was working on to producer Jasper Marsalis, better known as Slauson Malone, who helped refine them. Work on those songs resulted in the band's 2016 self-titled debut.

In 2017, Standing on the Corner released their second album Red Burns. Soon after the release of Red Burns, Slauson Malone quietly left the group due to ideological differences and in order to work on solo material. In 2019, they contributed to Solange's album When I Get Home, with production and writing credits on the songs "S McGregor (interlude)", "Can I Hold the Mic (interlude)", "Down With the Clique", "Nothing Without Intention (interlude)", and "Exit Scott (interlude)". After their contributions to Solange's project, multi-instrumentalist Caleb Giles announced he was leaving the group on good terms to focus on his solo rap career.

Standing on the Corner earned  production credits on Danny Brown's 2019 album uknowhatimsayin¿ for the track "Shine", on which Slauson Malone was also credited; however this is mostly as a result of reusing old material rather than a new collaboration. On May 11, 2020, they released the video for their single "Angel", starring Melvin Van Peebles. Peebles is a major influence for their catalog, with the group having sampled him multiple times, implementing spoken word passages into their record in a similar vein to Peebles' own albums.

Members

Current members
 Gio Escobar (born Giovanni Cortez) - vocals, production, guitar, bass (2014–present)

Standing on the Corner Art Ensemble (2019–present)
 Jack Nolan
 Lila Ramani
 Nate Cox
 Oluwaseun Odubiro
 Syl Dubenion
 Savannah Harris
 Tomin Perea Chamblee
 Buz

Past members
 Slauson Malone (born Jasper Armstrong Marsalis) - vocals, production, guitar (2015–2017)
 Caleb Giles - vocals, production, saxophone (2015–2019)

Discography

Studio albums
Standing on the Corner (2016)
Red Burns (2017)

Extended plays
G-E-T-O-U-T!! The Ghetto (2020)

Livestreamed albums
Afroprojection #1: The Atmosphere Phased at 120º and Went Blank When the Universe Collapsed: A Piece on Black Psychiatry and Alternate Dimensions (2018)

Live recordings
SOTC Double Bass Ensemble 4/24/19 (2019)
SOTC Art Ensemble 4/27/19 (2019)

Other credits

Medslaus - Poorboy (2017) 
 Guest vocals, production and songwriting on "Wontbleedme!" with Slauson Malone

MIKE - May God Bless Your Hustle (2017) 
 Production on "Greed"

Caleb Giles - There Will Be Rain (2018) 
 Guest vocals, production and songwriting on "The Flood" and "Wondering" with Slauson Malone

MIKE - Black Soap (2018) 
 Instrumentation on all tracks

Earl Sweatshirt - Some Rap Songs (2018) 
 Mixing and engineering on all tracks with Earl Sweatshirt
 Guest vocals and songwriting on "Ontheway!"
 Bass guitar on "Ontheway!" and "Riot!"

Solange - When I Get Home (2019) 
 Production and songwriting on "S McGregor (Interlude)", "Down With the Clique", "Nothing Without Intention (Interlude)", "Exit Scott (Interlude)", and "Not Screwed! (Interlude)" with various others
 Guest vocals on "Not Screwed! (Interlude)"

Danny Brown - U Know What I'm Sayin? (2019) 
 Production and songwriting on "Shine" with Paul White and Slauson Malone

References 

American experimental musical groups
American jazz ensembles from New York City
Musical groups established in 2014
Musical groups from Brooklyn
Alternative hip hop groups
2014 establishments in New York City
Jazz musicians from New York (state)